Sangameshwar Taluka is a taluka in Ratnagiri subdivision of Ratnagiri district in the Indian state of Maharashtra. The headquarters for the taluka is the town of Devrukh. In Sangameshwar the two rivers Sonavi and Shastri flow together.  The meaning of Sangama in Marathi (and most Indian languages) is confluence, and so the name "Sangameshwar". It is historically important as the place where Chhatrapati Sambhaji, son of Chhatrapati Shivaji was captured by Mughal Emperor Aurangzeb. Chhatrapati Sambhaji was tortured and executed in Tulapur.

Geography 
The city lies on the confluence of the Shastri River and Sonavi River. To the east of the city lie the Western Ghats and to the west lies Ganpatipule. The region has a tropical climate. The 'rainy season' — the monsoon lasts normally from June till October.
The dome of main temple is constructed of single piece of stone; lately extended for entrance.

Transportation
The nearest bus stand is Sangameshwar S.T. Stand (MSRTC) nearly 4 km from Sangameshwar Road railway station . The Sangameshwar railway station is located on National Highway 66 (Mumbai - Goa Highway).
The nearest main bus depot is Devrukh of MSRTC nearly 13 km from Sangameshwar S.T. Stand from where you can reach to Sakharapa and then Kolhapur also from Devrukh you can reach to Ratnagiri and Lanja city.

Attractions 

 Marleshwar Cave Shiva Temple, a cave temple located in the Sahyadris about 17 km from Devrukh and 44 km from Sangameshwar Road railway station (Konkan Railway).

Gallery

References

Cities and towns in Ratnagiri district
Talukas in Ratnagiri district